Hlegu is a small city in Yangon Division, Burma (Myanmar) about 45 km north-east of Yangon. It is located on both sides of the Ngamoyeik River (Ngamoyeik Chaung). Hlegu is the administrative seat of Hlegu Township.

Notes

Populated places in Yangon Region
Township capitals of Myanmar